The UEFA Euro 2016 qualifying Group G was one of the nine groups to decide which teams would qualify for the UEFA Euro 2016 finals tournament. Group G consisted of six teams: Russia, Sweden, Austria, Montenegro, Moldova, and Liechtenstein, where they played against each other home-and-away in a round-robin format.

The top two teams, Austria and Russia, qualified directly for the finals. As third-placed Sweden weren't the highest-ranked among all third-placed teams, they advanced to the play-offs, where they won against Denmark and thus qualified as well.

Standings

Matches 
The fixtures were released by UEFA the same day as the draw, which was held on 23 February 2014 in Nice. Times are CET/CEST, as listed by UEFA (local times are in parentheses).

Goalscorers

Discipline 
A player was automatically suspended for the next match for the following offences:
 Receiving a red card (red card suspensions could be extended for serious offences)
 Receiving three yellow cards in three different matches, as well as after fifth and any subsequent yellow card (yellow card suspensions were carried forward to the play-offs, but not the finals or any other future international matches)
The following suspensions were served during the qualifying matches:

Montenegro coach Branko Brnović served a one-match touchline ban and missed Montenegro's match against Russia (12 October 2015) after being sent off against Austria (9 October 2015).

Notes

References

External links 

UEFA Euro 2016 qualifying round Group G

Group G
2014–15 in Austrian football
Q
2014–15 in Moldovan football
2015–16 in Moldovan football
2014–15 in Montenegrin football
2015–16 in Montenegrin football
2014–15 in Liechtenstein football
2015–16 in Liechtenstein football
2014–15 in Russian football
Q
2014 in Swedish football
2015 in Swedish football
Q